Koami Dam is a gravity dam located in Tochigi prefecture in Japan. The dam is used for power production. The catchment area of the dam is 606.5 km2. The dam impounds about 10  ha of land when full and can store 627 thousand cubic meters of water. The construction of the dam was started on 1953 and completed in 1958.

References

Dams in Tochigi Prefecture
1958 establishments in Japan